Korean–Chinese cuisine, also known as Sino–Korean cuisine, is a hybrid cuisine developed by the ethnic Chinese in Korea. 

Despite originally being derived from Chinese cuisine, Korean-Chinese cuisine consists of unique dishes with Korean flavors and ingredients, making it a hybrid cuisine. 

In South Korea, the food is usually delivered. In other parts of the world, Korean Chinese dishes are typically served in Korean restaurants as well as in Chinese restaurants whose owners are immigrants from Korea or if they are from a Chinese–Korean family.

Characteristics 
Korean-Chinese cuisine was first developed during the 19th century in the port city of Incheon, where most of the ethnic Chinese population of Korea lived. Due to geographic proximity and the demographics of the Korean Chinese population, most Korean Chinese dishes are derived from (or influenced by) northern, eastern and northeastern Chinese dishes mostly from Shandong, where the majority of the earlier Chinese immigrants in Korea were from.

Dishes 
Three primary Korean-Chinese dishes are served in most Korean Chinese restaurants in South Korea and elsewhere:

 Jajangmyeon is a noodle dish topped with a thick sauce made of sweet bean sauce (chunjang), diced pork or seafood, and vegetables. Derived from the Shandong zhájiàngmiàn, Korean jajangmyeon is distinct from the zhájiàngmiàn dishes served in China.
 Jjamppong is a spicy noodle soup flavored with vegetables, meat or seafood, and chili oil. The dish derived from the Shandong chǎomǎmiàn and its name derived from chanpon, a Japanese Chinese dish derived from the Fujian mènmiàn. The addition of chili powder (gochugaru) and chili oil to jjamppong began during the 1960s.
 Tangsuyuk is a Korean version of a sweet and sour meat dish derived from the Shandong tángcùròu. It can be made with pork or beef, coated with corn- or potato starch or glutinous rice flour. The dish is served with a sweet-and-sour sauce typically made with soy sauce, vinegar, sugar, corn- or potato starch and fruits and vegetables such as carrots, cucumbers, onions, wood ear mushrooms, apples and pineapples.

Other dishes often served in Korean-Chinese restaurants include:

 Jungguk-naengmyeon, literally "Chinese cold noodles", is enjoyed during the summer. Jungguk-naengmyeon is made with junghwa-myeon (Chinese noodles), shredded five-spice marinated beef or pork (五香醬肉), cucumber, crab sticks, jellyfish and a fried egg in a cold chicken broth seasoned with soy sauce and spices. A sauce, mixed with mustard and peanut sauce, gives it a nutty, spicy flavor.
 Kkanpunggi (derived from gàn pēng jī /), fried chicken (with or without bones) glazed with a sweet, spicy sauce
 Kkanpung saeu (Korean: 깐풍새우): Deep-fried, breaded sweet-and-sour shrimp, with a mild spiciness distinct from tangsuyuk, tangsu saeu and the stir-fried Kung Pao shrimp (宮寶蝦）served in Chinese restaurants. Kkanpung saeu is served with a sweet sauce, peas, carrots, green onions and red chilli peppers.
 Rajogi (derived from làjiāojī /), similar to the Sichuan laziji, a Chinese chili chicken dish
 Udong, a noodle soup similar to jjamppong but with non-spicy white soup, derived from Sandong-style dǎlǔmiàn (打卤面/打滷麵) and not related to either Japanese udon or Korean-style udon (also called udong in Korean) despite the name. In Korean, udong refers to several types of noodle dishes (typically noodle soups) and thus the term used here is non-specific and not exclusive to Korean Chinese cuisine.
 Ulmyeon (Korean: 울면), similar to udon, consists of wheat-flour noodles, chopped vegetables and seafood in a chowder-like broth thickened with cornstarch. It is derived from a Chinese dish, wēnlŭmiàn.

Dumplings are also served at Korean-Chinese restaurants, usually a pan-fried cross between Chinese jiaozi and Korean mandu. Dried red-chili flakes are provided to season food or mixed with soy sauce.

Koreans traditionally eat Chinese food with a side dish of danmuji (yellow pickled radishes) and raw onion dipped in unfried chunjang. Kimchi, a Korean staple, is also eaten with Chinese food.

Hotteok is a Korean-Chinese food item that is now commonly sold as a street food.

Gallery

See also 

 Chinese people in Korea
 American Chinese cuisine
 Japanese Chinese cuisine

References

 
Chinese diaspora in Asia
Korean diaspora in Asia